Tsuru Pass (鶴峠, Tsuru-tōge) is a mountain pass in Kosuge, Yamanashi, Kitatsuru District, Yamanashi Prefecture, at an altitude of 870m. Yamanashi Prefectural Road 18 runs through the pass.

Outline 
The Shirasawa River (part of the Tama River system), flows north of the mountain pass, and the Tsuru River (part of the Sagami River system) flows to the south. The pass is a watershed dividing Tokyo Bay and Sagami Bay and is also the source of Tokyo's water supply. Several trails start here, including those to Mount Mitō, Matsuhime Pass and Mount Narakura.

The old road, passes through the pass, connects Tabayama and Kosuge, Yamanashi with Uenohara, wasn't open to vehicular traffic. Yamanashi Prefectural Route 18 has been built by Yamanashi prefecture for the use of motorists. Nagasaku Kannon Hall, was built in the Heian period, is in the pass and is an Important Cultural Property (Japan).

Transportation

References

External links 

 About Tsuru Pass (in Japanese)
 About hiking trails

Mountain passes of Japan